The Pommersche Landsmannschaft ("Territorial Association of Pomeranians", "Homeland Association of Pomeranians") is an organization of German refugees expelled from their homes in Pomerania after World War II.

See also 
Expulsion of Germans after World War II
Federation of Expellees
Flight and expulsion of Germans (1944–1950)
Pomerania

External links 
 Official website

Landsmannschaften